Addie McPhail (July 15, 1905 – April 14, 2003) was an American film actress. She appeared in more than 60 films between 1927 and 1941. She was the third and last wife of Roscoe "Fatty" Arbuckle. After she retired from acting, she served for 17 years as a volunteer nurse at the Motion Picture & Television Country House and Hospital in Woodland Hills, California.

Selected filmography

 Anybody Here Seen Kelly? (1928) - Mrs. Hickson
 The Three Sisters (1930) - Antonia
 Night Work (1930) - Trixie
 Midnight Daddies (1930) - Trixie - Charlie's Sweetheart
 Won by a Neck (1930)
 Extravagance (1930) - Helen - Fred's Secretary (uncredited)
 Up a Tree (1930) - Addie
 Marriage Rows (1931) - Winnie
 Girls Demand Excitement (1931) - Sue Street (uncredited)
 Ex-Plumber (1931) - Addie - The Wife
 Aloha (1931) - Rosalie
 Beach Pajamas (1931)
 Corsair (1931) - Jean Phillips
 Smart Work (1931) - Billy's Wife
 Keep Laughing (1932)
 Hollywood Luck (1932)
 Merry Wives of Reno (1934) - Mrs. Dillingworth (uncredited)
 By Your Leave (1934) - Gloria Dawn (uncredited)
 Bordertown (1935) - Carter's Girl (uncredited)
 Diamond Jim (1935) - (uncredited)
 It's in the Air (1935) - (uncredited)
 Women of Glamour (1937) - Minor Role (uncredited)
 Northwest Passage (1940) - Jane Browne (uncredited)
 The Cowboy and the Blonde (1941) - Cafe Hostess (uncredited)

References

External links

1905 births
2003 deaths
American film actresses
American silent film actresses
People from Hopkins County, Kentucky
20th-century American actresses
21st-century American women